Conasprella fijiensis is a species of sea snail, a marine gastropod mollusk in the family Conidae, the cone snails and their allies.

Like all species within the genus Conus, these snails are predatory and venomous. They are capable of "stinging" humans, therefore live ones should be handled carefully or not at all.

Description
The size of the shell varies between 12 mm and 18 mm.

Distribution
This marine species occurs off Fiji and Tonga.

References

Conus (Gastropoda, Conidae) from offshore French Polynesia: Description of dredging from TARASOC expedition, with new records and new species. Xenophora Taxonomy 5: 26-49
 Puillandre N., Duda T.F., Meyer C., Olivera B.M. & Bouchet P. (2015). One, four or 100 genera? A new classification of the cone snails. Journal of Molluscan Studies. 81: 1-23

External links
 The Conus Biodiversity website
 
 Holotype in MNHN, Paris

fijiensis
Gastropods described in 2008